The first USS Shad (SP-551) was a United States Navy patrol vessel in commission from 1917 to 1919.

Shad was built as a private motorboat of the same name by George Lawley & Son at Neponset, Massachusetts in 1907.  On 15 May 1917, the U.S. Navy purchased her from Herbert C. Talbot for use as a section patrol vessel during World War I. She was commissioned as USS Shad (SP-551) on 24 May 1917.

Presumably assigned to the 1st Naval District, Shad served on patrol duties in Boston Harbor at Boston, Massachusetts, for the rest of World War I and during the first few months of 1919.

Shad was decommissioned in 1919, stricken from the Navy List on 18 August 1919, and sold on 10 September 1919 to the J. E. Doherty Company of Boston.

References

Department of the Navy Naval History and Heritage Command Online Library of Selected Images: U.S. Navy Ships: USS Shad (SP-551), 1917-1919. Previously Civilian Motor Boat Shad (1907)
NavSource Online: Section Patrol Craft Photo Archive: Shad (SP 551)

Patrol vessels of the United States Navy
World War I patrol vessels of the United States
Ships built in Boston
1907 ships